Limbus (Lat. "edge, boundary") may refer to:

 Corneal limbus, the border of the cornea and the sclera (the white of the eye)
 Limbus of fossa ovalis, in the heart
 Limbus 3 and Limbus 4, two line-ups of a German avant-garde musical group
 Limbus, a type of garment trim added to the stola in Ancient Rome
 Limbus Company, a gacha game.

See also
 Limbo, a speculative idea about the afterlife condition of those who die in original sin without being assigned to the Hell of the Damned in Catholic Church theology (referring to the "edge" of Hell)
 Limbu people, an ethnic group in Nepal and India